The Wilderness Inside is the third studio album by American indie rock band Army Navy, released on July 15, 2014 on The Fever Zone label. The lead single, "Crushed Like the Car", was released on July 15, 2013.

The album was met with positive reviews from music critics, getting 3.5 out of 5 from AllMusic and 8.3 out of 10 from Paste Magazine. Earbuddy named it the 68th best album of 2014.

Track listing

Personnel 
 Justin Kennedy - lead vocals, guitar
 Louie Schultz - lead guitar, vocals
 Douglas Randall - drums, vocals

References

External links 
 The Wilderness Inside on iTunes
 
 

2014 albums